Thoresby may refer to:

John Thoresby (disambiguation)
Ralph Thoresby
South Thoresby
Thoresby, Nottinghamshire
Thoresby Colliery
Thoresby Hall